Matsapha Airport  is an airport located near Manzini, a city in Manzini District of Eswatini. It serves flights of the Eswatini Government and mercy flights.

History 
Although a new airport for Manzini, King Mswati III International Airport, was inaugurated in March 2014, Airlink chose to continue flying to Mastapha. However, the Eswatini Civil Aviation Authority (ESWACAA) required the airline to end flights to Matsapha on 29 September 2014 and switch to King Mswati III Airport the following day.

The Matsapha Airport was still planned to be used by the royal family and the army. The airport recorded 70,000 passengers yearly until it closed. All the commercial flights had one destination, the O. R. Tambo International Airport in Johannesburg. The plan to replace the Matsapha Airport was announced in 2000 by King Mswati.

Facilities

See also 
 List of airports in Eswatini
 Transport in Eswatini

References

External links
 Everything about Matsapha/Manzini International Airport – History, recent statistics, airlines, planespotting, parking and car rental
 
 

Airports in Eswatini